Teodorico Caporaso (born 14 September 1987) is a male Italian racewalker who won four international medals at senior level at the race walk competitions. He competed at the 2020 Summer Olympics in 50 km walk.

Biography
He competed in the 50 kilometres walk event at the 2015 World Championships in Athletics in Beijing, China.

In 2019, he competed in the men's 50 kilometres walk at the 2019 World Athletics Championships held in Doha, Qatar. He did not finish his race.

He won his first national title on 50 km with a time of 4:01:04 in Ostia on 23 January 2021.

Achievements

See also
 Italy at the IAAF World Race Walking Cup
 Italy at the European Race Walking Cup

References

External links
 

Italian male racewalkers
Living people
Place of birth missing (living people)
1987 births
World Athletics Championships athletes for Italy
Athletes (track and field) at the 2016 Summer Olympics
Olympic athletes of Italy
Athletes (track and field) at the 2020 Summer Olympics
21st-century Italian people